Brooklyn is a suburb of the city of Pretoria, South Africa. It is a well-established and wealthy area, lying to the east of the city centre, encompassing high-end residential properties and several upmarket mall developments. It borders the University of Pretoria to its north and the suburbs of Groenkloof and Waterkloof to its south. Brooklyn is also the location of Pretoria Boys High School. The Brooklyn Mall opened in 1989.

History
The suburb was established on an old farm called Uitval in 1902 and takes its name from the surveyor James Brook.

Demographics 
According to the South African National Census of 2011, 4,177 people lived in Brooklyn.

74.8% were White, 18.8% Black African, 2.2% Indian or Asian and 1.6% Coloured.

51.3% spoke Afrikaans, 33.8% English, 2.4% Northern Sotho, 1.9% Tswana and 10.6% some other language as their first language.

References

Suburbs of Pretoria